Al Khums or Khoms District was a district of Libya from 1983 to 1995.  It was in the northwest area of Libya, bordering the Mediterranean Sea.  Its capital was Khoms.

It is notable for the ancient Roman city of Leptis Magna, which is 120 km (74.5 mi) east of Tripoli along the coast. Leptis Magna prospered for 500 years, reaching its peak under the patronage of Emperor Septimius Severus aka "the Grim African".
Al Murgub 1998 to present
Al Khums 1983-1995

120 km east of Libya capital Tripoli 
Area code 053
Time zone UTC+2

Last statistic population 427.886

Transport 
In 2007, construction of the new Libyan railways was proceeding in this area.

Industry 
Walterbau of Germany is building a concrete sleeper plant.

References 

Districts of Libya
Tripolitania

ar:الخمس (مدينة)
ca:Al Khums
it:Al Khums
lt:Humsas
pl:Al-Chums
ro:Al Khums
sc:Al Khums